Igor Siqueira Pessanha or simply Igor (born 14 June 1988 in Campos dos Goytacazes, Rio de Janeiro state) is a Brazilian footballer who currently plays as a striker for Santo André in Brazil.

Club career
Igor moved to Campeonato Brasileiro Série C  club, Adap Galo Maringá from Corinthians for the 2007 season.  He was transferred to Sevilla on 1 August 2007 on a five-year contract.

International career
He participated in the 2005 FIFA World U-17 Cup for Brazil, and played the whole final where they lost 3-0 to Mexico. He was joint runner-up to the golden boot, bagging four goals in the tournament.

He has played for various levels at the national set-up from U-15 to U-17, scoring a total of 37 goals in 50 games .

External links 
  Stats at ForaDeJogo
  theFA.com
  www2.br
  esportes

1988 births
Living people
Brazilian footballers
Association football forwards
Cruzeiro Esporte Clube players
Esporte Clube Juventude players
Sport Club Corinthians Paulista players
Sevilla FC players
Sportspeople from Rio de Janeiro (state)